The Bengaluru NavaNirmana Party is an Indian political party, formally launched on 22 September 2019. The party is only focused on the municipal elections in the Greater Bengaluru Area, primarily BBMP.

Founded by residents of Bengaluru, the members of the party include grassroots organizers who have worked in fields of solid waste management, animal welfare, water conservation, wastewater management, clean energy, roads, education, and healthcare.

Ideology 
BNP has no ambitions beyond Bengaluru, and none of its founders are politicians. The party states that it is not personality-driven.

BNP’s motto is “ನನ್ನ ನಗರ! ನನ್ನ ಹೆಮ್ಮೆ! ನನ್ನ ಜವಾಬ್ದಾರಿ!" (My City! My Pride! My Responsibility!)

References 

Anti-corruption parties
Political parties in Karnataka
2019 establishments in Karnataka
Political parties established in 2019